Anthidium aztecum is a species of bee in the family Megachilidae, the leaf-cutter, carder, or mason bees.

Distribution
Mexico

Distribution
Middle America

References

aztecum
Insects described in 1878
Taxa named by Ezra Townsend Cresson